Jebel Kelti is a mountain in the Tanger-Tetouan-Al Hoceima region, Morocco. It is located south of Tetouan in Chefchaouen Province. This mountain is part of the Rif mountain chain.

Description
Jebel Kelti is a limestone mountain, one of the highest in the Rif range with an elevation of about 1912 metres. It is located between Tetouan and Chefchaouen in the Tanger-Tetouan-Al Hoceima region of Morocco. It has steep sides and a small summit area that offers a panoramic view of the surrounding region. There are some well-preserved cedar forests on its slopes.

References

External links

Fiche technique de la randonnée à jbel Kelti dans la région Tetouan-Chefchaouen 
Ecotourism in Jbel Kelti - Chefchaouen - Morocco
Gite d'Etape Ihettachene Jbel Kelti Tetouan مأوى إحتاشن

Kelti
Rif
Geography of Tanger-Tetouan-Al Hoceima